This is a complete taxonomy of the moth family Limacodidae.

Subfamily Chrysopolominae

Subfamily Limacodinae

Subfamily uncertainly assigned

A-D

E-L

M-P

R-Z

References

Limacodidae